William McGee (born 1947) is an Irish former Gaelic footballer. His league and championship career at senior level with the Mayo county team spanned nine seasons from 1967 to 1976.

McGee made his debut on the inter-county scene when he was selected for the Mayo minor team. A Connacht runner-up in this grade, he later won an All-Ireland medal with the Mayo under-21 team in 1967. McGee made his senior debut during the 1967–68 league. Over the course of the next nine seasons, he won one Conncaht medal and one National Football League medal. He played his last game for Mayo in March 1976.

Honours
Mayo
Connacht Senior Football Championship (1): 1969
National Football League (1): 1969–70

References

1947 births
Living people
Burrishoole Gaelic footballers
Connacht inter-provincial Gaelic footballers
Garda Síochána officers
Mayo inter-county Gaelic footballers